Helen Dauvray (February 14, 1859 – December 6, 1923) was an American actress.     She was a star in Bronson Howard's play One of Our Girls (1885), among others.

Biography
Dauvray was born on February 14, 1859, in San Francisco, California. She  married  baseball player John Montgomery Ward on October 12, 1887. They divorced, though a trophy called the "Dauvray Cup" was created during their union in 1887 and awarded until 1893.  Books about baseball history recount the details of their celebrity marriage.

In 1896 she married Admiral Albert G. Winterhalter. She died on December 6, 1923, in Washington, D.C. She was buried at Arlington National Cemetery with her husband.

References

External links
 

1859 births
1923 deaths
Burials at Arlington National Cemetery
19th-century American actresses
American stage actresses
Actresses from San Francisco